Kurelac is a Croatian surname. Notable people with the surname include:

  (1811–1874), Croatian writer and philologist
 Miroslav Kurelac (1926–2004), Croatian historian

Croatian surnames